Jalud is a Palestinian village in the Nablus Governorate in the northern West Bank. Its land area consists of 16,517 dunams (square kilometers), 98 of which constitutes its built-up area. Jalud is encircled by four illegal outposts: Esh Kodesh, Adi Ad, Ahiya and Shvut Rachel. Jalud residents were blocked by both IDF forces and settlers from tending most of their farms from 2001 to 2007. In 2007 permission was given to farm their groves,  twice a year for a few days, on condition that prior coordinating arrangements are made with the IDF.

Location
It is bordered by Duma to the east, Qusra and Talfit to the north, As Sawiya and Qaryut to the west, and Turmus Ayya to the south.

History
Potsherds from Iron Age II, Hellenistic, Byzantine, Umayyad, Crusader/Ayyubid and Mamluk eras have been found here.

Clermont-Ganneau noted several rock-hewn tombs SSW of the village. One he excavated had three arcosolia, and a fully working stone door.

Ottoman era
In 1596, Jalud appeared in Ottoman tax registers as being a village in the nahiya of Jabal Qubal in the liwa of Nablus. It had a population of 20 households, all Muslim. They paid a fixed tax rate of 33.3% on agricultural products, including wheat, barley, summer crops, olive trees, goats and beehives; a total of 22,070 akçe. All of the revenues went to a waqf. Potsherds from the early Ottoman era have also been found here.

In 1838 Jalud was counted as a Muslim village in the subdistrict of el-Beitawi, east of Nablus.

In 1870 French explorer Victor Guérin visited the village, which he found to have about 300 inhabitants. In 1882, the PEF's Survey of Western Palestine, (SWP), described Jalud as "a small village on low ground, with olives to the south".

British Mandate era
In the 1922 census of Palestine conducted by the British Mandate authorities, Jalud had a population of 145 Muslims, increasing in the 1931 census to 225, still all Muslim, in 52  houses.

In the 1945 statistics the population had increased to 300 Muslims,  while the total land area was 15,815 dunams, according to an official land and population survey. Of this, 457 dunams were allocated for plantations and irrigable land, 6,838 for cereals, while 24 dunams were classified as built-up (urban) areas.

Jordanian era
In the wake of the 1948 Arab–Israeli War, and after the 1949 Armistice Agreements, Jalud came under Jordanian rule. It was annexed by Jordan in 1950.

The Jordanian census of 1961 found 290 inhabitants.

Post-1967

Since the Six-Day War in 1967, Jalud has been under Israeli occupation.

In 2007, Jalud's population was 464 according to the Palestinian Central Bureau of Statistics (PCBS). There were 91 non-residential buildings, 94 houses and five business establishments in the village. The average household size was 5.5 persons. According to Jalud's mayor, the village experiences high unemployment and migration due to land confiscation by Israel and sporadic violence from nearby Israeli settlements, which for 10 years has impeded villagers' access to their groves.
On 9 February 2011, Israeli settlers from Ahiya, a nearby settlement outpost, attacked Jalud, demanding residents evacuate their houses. Israeli police arrived following clashes between the settlers and Palestinian residents, dispersing the former using tear gas and stun grenades. 
On October 21, 2011, while international activists and Combatants for Peace assisted the Jalud villagers in reclaiming their harvests, a group of 4 armed and masked men from Esh Kodesh, a satellite outpost, confronted them yelling that they must get off what the group asserted was outpost land. They then threw a stun grenade and fired in the direction of the harvesters, some of whom were then clubbed. According to the testimony of Israeli eyewitnesses, the IDF and Border Police present did not intervene, other than to fire more tear gas grenades at the harvesters and wounded. A formal complaint was laid. Follow-up checks by the Israeli NGO Yesh Din over several months indicate that a police investigation is "ongoing".
On 9 October 2013, Israeli arsonists, apparently from the nearby outposts, intruded into the Jalud elementary school, hurled rocks and damaged 5 cars belonging to the teaching body. They then set fire to the village's olive groves, damaging some 400 trees. A settler website vindicated the attack as a reprisal for the dismantlement of another illegal outpost, Givat Geulat Zion, carried out by the IDF that morning. Three youths from Adi Ad were subsequently arrested on suspicion of involvement, but local Palestinian eyewitnesses have stated that the assailants, some 20, did not appear to be minors.
In 2017, Fawzi Ibrahim reported waited two months for getting access to his lands, and then having only 2 days to plow and plant. Muhammad Muqbil reported that he had olive trees stolen by settlers, and needed help from Rabbis for Human Rights to get access to his lands.

Olive groves
In her 2009 publication entitled Tree Flags, legal scholar and ethnographer Irus Braverman describes how Palestinians identify olive groves as "their symbol of their longtime agricultural connection to the land."

Settler violence 
In April 2022, Haaretz reported that Jewish settlers from the nearby illegal outposts that encircle the town promoted attacks with firebombs in Jalud, torching cars and house yards, in what the Israeli newspaper classified as a "pogrom", "flaunt evil" and "settler terror".

References

Bibliography

External links
Welcome To Jalud
Survey of Western Palestine, Map 15: IAA, Wikimedia commons
  Qaryut Village Profile (including Jalud Locality), Applied Research Institute–Jerusalem, ARIJ
 Aerial photo, ARIJ
  The Expropriation of Jalud's Lands Towards the Buntustanization of the West Bank, 28 December 1997, POICA
 Land confiscated for settlement protection Qarut and Jalud Villages, 27 August 2006, POICA
   Shivot Raheil Colonists Plough 14 Dunums of Palestinian Lands in Jalud Village 22 May 2010, POICA
  Confiscation Orders Against Tens of Dunums of Agricultural Lands in Jalud village, 17 October 2010, POICA
Jalud… Torched Olive and Expanding Colonies, 2 August 2011, POICA
Expansion of Shvut Rahel on Jalud lands, 1 March 2014, POICA

Throne villages
Villages in the West Bank
Nablus Governorate
Municipalities of the State of Palestine